Rafael Acevedo may refer to

 Rafael Acevedo (cyclist)
 Rafael Acevedo (writer)